Andrei Dumitru Sin (born 26 October 1991) is a Romanian professional footballer under contract with Liga II side Metaloglobus București. A versatile player, Sin plays mainly as a left-back, but he has also been deployed as a right-back or a winger.

Club career

ASA Târgu Mureș
After playing for a number of teams in the Romanian second tier like: Viitorul Constanța, Universitatea Craiova and Delta Tulcea, in January 2017, Sin signed with Liga I club ASA Târgu Mureș. Although he impressed here, ASA Târgu Mureș were relegated and the player soon left the club.

Politehnica Iași

In July 2017, Sin signed a one-year contract with Moldavian club Politehnica Iași. After a very strong first year with the Liga I team in which they finished the league on sixth place, he signed an extension to his contract to keep him with the club for another two years.

Dinamo București

On 18 June 2019, Sin signed a contract with Dinamo București.
On 16 February 2020, Sin scored his first goal with Dinamo București, from a well-placed free-kick against arch-rivals FCSB, the game ended 2-1 to Dinamo.

In January 2021, he ended his contract with Dinamo.

Honours

Viitorul Constanța
Liga III: 2009–10

Universitatea Craiova
Liga II: 2013–14

Juventus București
Liga III: 2015–16

References

External links
 
 

1991 births
Living people
Footballers from Bucharest
Romanian footballers
Association football midfielders
Liga I players
Liga II players
FC Sportul Studențesc București players
FC Viitorul Constanța players
CS Otopeni players
FC Delta Dobrogea Tulcea players
CS Universitatea Craiova players
ASA 2013 Târgu Mureș players
FC Politehnica Iași (2010) players
FC Dinamo București players
ACS Viitorul Târgu Jiu players
LPS HD Clinceni players
FC Metaloglobus București players